Luis Jorge Mayser Ardaya (born July 21, 1928, San Ignacio de Velasco, Santa Cruz) is a Bolivian politician. He is the general secretary of the Bolivian Socialist Falange (FSB). Mayser joined FSB at the age of twelve.

Mayser was elected to the Chamber of Deputies in 1997, from the single-member constituency 58 in Santa Cruz (covering areas in the provinces Velasco, Chiquitos, Angel Sandoval and German Busch) on a Nationalist Democratic Action (ADN) ticket. At the time he was the sole FSB parliamentarian.

In 2004 Mayser was awarded the title "hijo ilustre" by the Santa Cruz de la Sierra municipal council, for his role in founding the Comité Pro Santa Cruz.

Bibliography
Mayser is the author of Alto Paragua: Verdaderas Guerrillas Bolivianas, an account of the struggle of the FSB against the Revolutionary Nationalist Movement government. He has also authored Santa Cruz y sus provincias.

References

1928 births
Falangists
Living people
Bolivian Socialist Falange politicians
Members of the Chamber of Deputies (Bolivia)